Kees Zijlstra (24 January 1931, Zeist -  25 April 2013, Sneek) was a Dutch politician, who was a member of the House of Representatives (1979–1991).

References

1931 births
2013 deaths
Labour Party (Netherlands) politicians
Members of the House of Representatives (Netherlands)
Members of the Senate (Netherlands)
People from Zeist